Situation Vacant is a 1946 detective novel by the British writer Cecil Street, writing under the pen name of Miles Burton. It was the thirty fourth entry in a lengthy series of books featuring the detective Desmond Merrion and Inspector Arnold of Scotland Yard. As with much of the series it takes place in rural England.

Synopsis
Two secretaries working for Mrs. Whyttington, owner of a manor house in a small village, die of poisoning within a few months of each other.

References

Bibliography
 Evans, Curtis. Masters of the "Humdrum" Mystery: Cecil John Charles Street, Freeman Wills Crofts, Alfred Walter Stewart and the British Detective Novel, 1920-1961. McFarland, 2014.
 Herbert, Rosemary. Whodunit?: A Who's Who in Crime & Mystery Writing. Oxford University Press, 2003.
 Reilly, John M. Twentieth Century Crime & Mystery Writers. Springer, 2015.

1946 British novels
Novels by Cecil Street
British mystery novels
British detective novels
Collins Crime Club books
Novels set in England